Jake Paul vs. Anderson Silva was a professional boxing match contested between Jake Paul and Anderson Silva. The bout took place on  October 29, 2022, at the Desert Diamond Arena in Glendale, Arizona and ended with a Paul win. The fight generated 200-300,000 PPV buys.

Background 

It was announced on September 6, 2022, that undefeated 25-year old Jake Paul would face mixed martial artist, boxer and former UFC Middleweight Champion 47-year old Anderson Silva  on October 29 in Glendale, Arizona.

Press conferences 
Three press conferences were held in the following cities:

 12 September 2022 – 6121 Sunset Blvd, Los Angeles, California
 13 September 2022 – 9400 W Maryland Ave, Glendale, Arizona
 27 October 2022 – Glendale, Arizona

During the conferences, Paul spoke about growing up as one of "Silva’s fans" and watching the Brazilian "dominate" the sport.

Fight card

Result
The fight, in front of a 14,000 strong crowd on the night of October 29, 2022, lasted all the designated eight rounds. Paul was awarded the win by a unanimous decision, which moved him to a record of 6 wins and no defeats. In the final round, he knocked down Silva.

Pay-per-view numbers 
The bout priced at $59.99 sold around an estimated 200-300,000 pay-per-view buys. Paul revealed in an episode of his brother's podcast Impaulsive that his suspicion behind the low sales performance was due to an incident involving Silva claiming within an interview that he was knocked out during a sparring session within his camp before the upcoming fight, thus creating a lack of interest in the bout.

References

External links 

Boxing matches
2022 in boxing
2022 in sports in Arizona
Boxing in Arizona
Boxing on Showtime
Events in Glendale, Arizona
Pay-per-view boxing matches
Crossover boxing events
October 2022 sports events in the United States
Sports competitions in Maricopa County, Arizona